Nathan Brown (August 19, 1986) is an American football coach and former player. He is head football coach at the University of Central Arkansas, a position he has held since the 2018 season.

Early life
Born in Hattiesburg, Mississippi and raised in Russellville, Arkansas. He attended Russellville High School, where he was an All-State quarterback his senior season playing for head coach Jeff Holt. Brown was a three-year letterman at Russellville. His senior year he completed 242 of 353 passes for 3,385 yards and 33 TDs. He was named the KARV Dream Team Player of the Year, the Russellville Courier Dream Team and All-River Valley. Brown also lettered three years in baseball and was an All-State performer in 2003 and 2004.

College career
He was a record breaking quarterback at Central Arkansas. In addition to being a four-year starter, he was the Southland Conference Player of the Year in 2008 and the SLC Offensive Player of the Year in 2007. Brown was also a Walter Payton Award finalist in 2008 and was a three-time All-American for the Bears. Brown was also the first UCA player to play in the Senior Bowl in 2008. He was also selected to play in the East-West Shrine Game. He set state collegiate passing records for yards (10,558) and touchdowns (100), and led the Bears to the NCAA Division II quarterfinals as a redshirt freshman. Brown was the Gulf South Conference Freshman of the Year in 2005. Brown led the Bears to the 2005 Gulf South Conference championship, and the 2008 Southland Conference championship.

Professional career

He was signed by the Jacksonville Jaguars as an undrafted free agent in 2009. After being released by the Jaguars he went to the New Orleans Saints for a short time.

Brown went into coaching after his short pro football stint, hired by his alma mater in 2009 to coach quarterbacks. In 2014 he was promoted to offensive coordinator for UCA. 

On December 9, 2017, he was introduced as the new head coach of the UCA Bears football team, his first head coaching job.

Head coaching record

References

External links
 Central Arkansas profile

1986 births
Living people
American football quarterbacks
Central Arkansas Bears football coaches
Central Arkansas Bears football players
Jacksonville Jaguars players
New Orleans Saints players
Sportspeople from Hattiesburg, Mississippi
Players of American football from Mississippi